Westland Hialeah High School is a four-year public high school located at 4000 West 18th Avenue in Hialeah, Florida, United States, a suburb of Miami. The school is a part of Miami-Dade County Public Schools. Its principal is Giovanna Handal.

As of the 2014-15 school year, the school had an enrollment of 2,114 students and 82.0 classroom teachers (on an FTE basis), for a student–teacher ratio of 25.8:1. There were 1,694 students (80.1% of enrollment) eligible for free lunch and 111 (5.3% of students) eligible for reduced-cost lunch.

The school, fourth to serve the Miami suburb of Hialeah, was built as a reliever for the three overcrowded high schools serving the area. It opened in January 2008, taking the entire southwestern portion of the city in boundaries which are mostly served by Miami Springs and Hialeah-Miami Lakes High School. The school holds ninth through twelfth grade. Its first graduating class was the class of 2010, and its founding class was the class of 2011, which graduated in June 2011.

School uniforms
The school requires its students to wear uniforms consisting of a grey, red, or black polo shirt and black or khaki pants. No sandals or other open-toed shoes are allowed. Students are not allowed to wear jeans or “sweat pant style bottoms” of any type. In addition, students are required to wear their IDs at all times.

Demographics 
Westland Hialeah High School is 95% Hispanic (mostly Cuban and of Cuban descent).

See also

Education in the United States

References

External links
Westland Hialeah Senior High School
Miami-Dade Schools information on Westland Hialeah High School
Boundary redefinition article for the city of Hialeah upon opening of Westland Hialeah High School

Educational institutions established in 2007
Miami-Dade County Public Schools high schools
Education in Hialeah, Florida
Magnet schools in Florida
Public high schools in Florida
2007 establishments in Florida